Robert "Speedy" Neal (born August 26, 1962) is an American former professional football running back who played in National Football League (NFL) for the Buffalo Bills in 1984. Neal appeared in a total of 12 career games (2 starts).

References

1962 births
Living people
People from Key West, Florida
Players of American football from Florida
American football running backs
Miami Hurricanes football players
Buffalo Bills players